Simpsonville may refer to:

 Simpsonville, Kentucky
 Simpsonville, Maryland
 Simpsonville, South Carolina
 Simpsonville, Texas
 Simpsonville, California, former name of Bear Valley, Mariposa County, California